is a passenger railway station in located in the city of Nabari,  Mie Prefecture, Japan, operated by the private railway operator Kintetsu Railway.

Lines
Kikyōgaoka Station is served by the Osaka Line, and is located 70.0 rail kilometers from the starting point of the line at Ōsaka Uehommachi Station.

Station layout
The station consists of two opposed side platforms, connected by an elevated station building above the platforms and tracks.

Platforms

Adjacent stations

History
Kikyōgaoka Station opened on October 1, 1964 as a station on the Kintetsu Osaka Line. A new station building was completed in July 1970.

Passenger statistics
In fiscal 2019, the station was used by an average of 2813 passengers daily (boarding passengers only).

Surrounding area
Kikyogaoka residential area

See also
List of railway stations in Japan

References

External links

 Kintetsu: Kikyōgaoka Station

Railway stations in Japan opened in 1964
Railway stations in Mie Prefecture
Stations of Kintetsu Railway
Nabari, Mie